Thorpe Fell Top is the top of the hill of Burnsall and Thorpe Fell in the Yorkshire Dales, itself forming part of a larger wedge of ground between Wharfedale and Skipton.

The summit of this grouse moor is 506 metres above sea level and topped with a trig point. It was listed in Alan Dawson's "The Relative Hills of Britain" as a Marilyn.

Thorpe Fell Top is probably most easily visited from either Thorpe or Burnsall. The track and path marked on Ordnance Survey maps to the north and west of the summit continues all the way to the top of Cracoe Fell. The latter can also be reached along Fell Lane from the village of Cracoe.

References

Marilyns of England
Peaks of the Yorkshire Dales
Wharfedale